The Ch'ŏllima Steel Complex  in Kangch'ŏl-dong, Ch'ŏllima-guyŏk, Namp'o is one of North Korea's largest steel mills with an annual production capacity in the millions of tons. Originally opened during the Japanese colonial era as the Kangsŏn Steel Works, it was nationalised after the partition of Korea and has since been expanded several times.

Currently, there are facilities for the production of steel and other alloys, steel rods, pipes and other metal products, and a facility for the production of large forgings and castings, along with a test and analysis centre. The production facility is equipped with electric furnaces, crushing and rolling mills, 6- and 10,000 tonne presses, oxygen separators and continuous mills. The complex also features metallurgical academies, cultural centres, childcare facilities, clinics, nightclubs and nursing homes. The complex was awarded the Order of Kim Il-sung.

The facility is served by the Korean State Railway via Kangsŏn on the P'yŏngnam Line with extensive trackage within the complex.

Kim Jong-il visited the site in 2008 or Juche 97 according to the North Korean Calendar which starts on 1912 following the birth of Kim Il-sung.

References

Some photos taken by tourists in 2012 : http://llukasz.com/chollima-steel-works-pyongyang/
Steel companies of North Korea